Wilhelm Büsing (born 2 March 1921) is a German former equestrian who competed at the 1952 Summer Olympics in Helsinki, where he won a silver medal in team eventing and a bronze medal in the individual tournament. He also won a silver medal in team eventing at the 1954 European Championships. A veterinarian by trade, he was also present at the 1956, 1960, and 1964 Summer Olympics as a coach and trainer. In addition to his veterinary practice, he also worked as horse breeder.

References

1921 births
Living people
German centenarians
Men centenarians
German male equestrians
Olympic equestrians of Germany
Olympic silver medalists for Germany
Olympic bronze medalists for Germany
Equestrians at the 1952 Summer Olympics
Olympic medalists in equestrian
Medalists at the 1952 Summer Olympics